Sharyakovo (Şäräk) is a rural locality (a village) in Lagerevsky Selsoviet, Salavatsky District, Bashkortostan, Russia. The population was 170 as of 2010. There are 3 streets.

Geography 
Sharyakovo is located 35 km northeast of Maloyaz (the district's administrative centre) by road. Lagerevo is the nearest rural locality.

References 

Rural localities in Salavatsky District